Nathaniel Shaw Jr. (17031778) was a Connecticut Patriot, and an American Revolutionary War soldier.  He is frequently referred to as "Captain Nathaniel Shaw, Jr."

Life and career
Nathaniel Shaw was a successful merchant who came to live in New London from Fairfield CT. He purchased land along Bank Street in 1734, with his wife Temperance. In 1756, Shaw hired Acadian exiles to build a mansion from the granite ledge at the edge of the river. The Shaw Mansion was used as the Naval Headquarters for the state of Connecticut during the Revolutionary war. His son, Nathaniel Shaw Jr. was appointed by both the Continental Congress and the State of Connecticut as the naval agent during the American Revolutionary War, and he had the responsibility of drawing up orders for privateers as well as distributing captured prizes. His Shaw Mansion (New London, Connecticut) is now the headquarters of the Connecticut Historical Society.

References
Notes

Bibliography
Caulkins, Frances Manwaring History of New London Connecticut
Rogers, Ernest E. Connecticut's Naval Office at New London

External links

nlhistory.org
dunhamwilcox.net

1703 births
1778 deaths
People from Fairfield, Connecticut
Patriots in the American Revolution
People of Connecticut in the American Revolution
People of colonial Connecticut
Continental Army soldiers
Burials in Connecticut